Tommy Dale Gainey (born August 13, 1975), also known as "Two Gloves", is an American professional golfer on the PGA Tour.

Early life and education
Gainey was born in Darlington, South Carolina. He attended the Central Carolina Technical College, studying industrial maintenance, and graduated in 1999. Before becoming a professional golfer, he worked on an assembly line in South Carolina, wrapping insulation around hot water heaters for A.O. Smith Corporation.

Professional career

Early career
Gainey turned professional in 1997, and for the next several years played golf on smaller tours in the southern United States. Gainey won four events on the Egolf Tarheel Tour, two in 2006 and one in 2007. He also won an event on the NGA Hooters Tour, and he played on the Gateway Tour.

In 2005, Gainey appeared on the Golf Channel's show The Big Break IV: USA vs. Europe, being eliminated in the sixth episode. He would return to the show in 2007 for The Big Break VII: Reunion at Reunion, which he won. In 2007, Gainey played four events on the Nationwide Tour and recorded one top-ten finish. At the end of the 2007 season, he earned a PGA Tour card through graduating from Q-School, finishing the six rounds T-19, after going through all three elimination stages of qualifying, a total of 14 rounds. That made him the first Big Break alumnus to earn a PGA Tour card.

PGA Tour
Gainey played on the PGA Tour for the first time in 2008, but struggled for most of the season. He made only five cuts in 23 events and was 228th on the money list, before entering the last event of the season, the Children's Miracle Network Classic at the Walt Disney World Resort. In the last round, playing the Magnolia Course, he shot a 64 and finished second to Davis Love III by one stroke. That finish moved Gainey inside the top 150 on the money list (to 148th, an 80-spot leap), which gave him conditional status for the 2009 season. Gainey re-entered the Q-School to try and gain back full playing privileges, but finished well down the leaderboard in T80th. He then split his time between both the PGA Tour and Nationwide Tour in 2009, struggling again on the PGA Tour, making just 8 out of 15 cuts, with one top-25 finish. He ended the year 202nd on the money list, not even earning conditional status for 2010.

Gainey returned to the Nationwide Tour in 2010, where he played the full season. He recorded some impressive results, claiming his first Nationwide Tour title at the Melwood Prince George's County Open in June. Gainey won the event by one stroke over Frank Lickliter and Jin Park, with weekend rounds of 64 and 65 securing victory. The following month, Gainey won his second Nationwide Tour title at the Chiquita Classic, winning by three strokes over Joe Affrunti. He shot a 10 under round of 62 in round three on the way to the win. He finished the season fourth on the Nationwide Tour money list and secured a return to the PGA Tour in 2011.

In 2011, Gainey missed the cut in his first three events, then made six consecutive cuts through to the end of March. At the 2011 Waste Management Phoenix Open in Scottsdale, Arizona, he was in contention late in the final round, but made a quadruple-bogey 8 on the par-4 17th hole to finish tied for 8th. He posted a fifth-place finish at the Honda Classic in Florida a month later. Gainey's best 2011 Tour finish came at The Heritage in Hilton Head, South Carolina, when he needed a 15-foot putt on the 72nd green to tie clubhouse leader Brandt Snedeker, but missed it, finishing the event in third place. The next week on tour, Gainey finished in a tie for third again at the Zurich Classic of New Orleans, where he finished two strokes outside of a playoff. In August, due to his good play for the year, Gainey qualified to play in his first major championship at the PGA Championship at the Atlanta Athletic Club. He shot rounds of 81 and 74 to miss the cut, but bounced back with a third-place finish the next week at the Wyndham Championship. The third occasion in 2011 that Gainey had finished in the top three in an event. The result moved him to a career high of 84th in the world rankings. Gainey ended his breakthrough year with another T3rd finish at the Justin Timberlake Shriners Hospitals for Children Open in the Fall Series. Gainey ended the year 35th on the money list. with 17 cuts and 7 top-10s in 34 events.

Gainey started the 2012 season slowly, making only three of his first ten cuts, having to withdraw twice due to injury. He did not record a top 10 finish until the end of May at the Crowne Plaza Invitational at Colonial where he finished third for the fifth time in his career on the PGA Tour. For the rest of the season, Gainey played more consistently, making nine of the next thirteen cuts, but without any significant results. Then on October 21, 2012, during the Fall Series, after 105 starts and 48 cuts made, Gainey won his first PGA Tour event at the McGladrey Classic. He came from seven strokes back of final round leaders Jim Furyk and Davis Love III to win by one from David Toms, after shooting a final round of 60. Gainey had a putt from about 20 feet on the 18th green for a 59 but it missed on the right hand side.

In January 2020, Gainey won The Bahamas Great Exuma Classic on the Korn Ferry Tour, his first professional win since 2012. His winning score was 277 (11-under-par). He started the season with limited status on the PGA Tour as a past champion and on the Korn Ferry Tour after a T76 finish at Q School.

Personal
In December 2019, Gainey was arrested in a major prostitution sting in Florida. Gainey was not given prison time, but was sentenced to eleven months probation, 100 hours community service, and fines of $6,218.60.

Playing style, sponsors
Gainey wears black, wet-weather golf gloves, one on each hand, at all times when playing golf. He stated on October 21, 2012, that his father (who introduced him to the game) wears two gloves, and so he learned to play with them.

Gainey uses the very rare baseball grip on full shots, where he hooks his left (top) thumb behind his right hand (normal position for the left thumb for a right-handed golfer is under the right thumb). His swing is also notably jerky and eccentric, and has been described as "trying to kill a snake with a garden hose." His other 2011 sponsors included Under Armour, Adams Golf and The Dow Group. In 2012 Gainey made the switch to Callaway Clubs, and he continues to be sponsored by The Dow Group.

Professional wins (10)

PGA Tour wins (1)

Korn Ferry Tour wins (3)

NGA Hooters Tour wins (1)
2007 Bentonville Open

Egolf Tarhell Tour wins (4)
2006: Patriots Point Open (Egolf Tarheel Tour), River Run Classic (Egolf Tarheel Tour)
2007: Oldfield Open (Egolf Tarheel Tour)
2004 (or 2005): Egolf Tarheel Tour

Other wins (1)

Results in major championships

CUT = missed the half-way cut
"T" = tied

Results in The Players Championship

CUT = missed the halfway cut

Results in World Golf Championships

"T" = Tied

See also
2007 PGA Tour Qualifying School graduates
2010 Nationwide Tour graduates

References

External links

American male golfers
PGA Tour golfers
Korn Ferry Tour graduates
Golfers from South Carolina
People from Darlington, South Carolina
People from Bishopville, South Carolina
1975 births
Living people